This article displays the qualifying draw of the 2011 Monte-Carlo Rolex Masters.

Players

Seeds

Qualifiers

Qualifying draw

First qualifier

Second qualifier

Third qualifier

Fourth qualifier

Fifth qualifier

Sixth qualifier

Seventh qualifier

References
 Qualifying Draw

qualifying
Qualification for tennis tournaments